Stuffed Lion Award for Worst Film was one of the awards given to the worst Czech motion picture. Awards were discontinued in 2008.

Winners

References

Czech Lion Awards
Awards established in 1993
Ironic and humorous awards
1993 establishments in the Czech Republic
Awards disestablished in 2008
2008 disestablishments in the Czech Republic